Basketball competitions at the 2006 Commonwealth Games were held between Match 16 and 24, 2006.

The 2006 Commonwealth Games was the first Commonwealth Games at which the sport of  basketball was played. It was one of the sports that took the Games to regional Victoria, with games being played in a number of regional centres including Traralgon, Bendigo, Ballarat, and Geelong. The finals were played in Melbourne at Melbourne Multi Purpose Venue.

Venues

Medal summary

Medal count

Results

Men's

Group A

Group B

Fifth to eighth place

Seventh place

Fifth-place match

Semifinals

Bronze-medal match

Gold-medal match

Women's

Group A

Group B

Fifth to eighth place

Seventh place

Fifth-place match

Semifinals

Bronze-medal match

Gold-medal match

References

External links
 Official 2006 Commonwealth Games Basketball page

basketball
2006 in basketball
2006
2005–06 in Australian basketball
International basketball competitions hosted by Australia